Songkhla Rajabhat University (Thai: มหาวิทยาลัยราชภัฏสงขลา) or SKRU is a Thai public university under the Rajabhat University system. The campus is in Songkhla Province, south Thailand.

Songkhla Rajabhat University contains seven faculties: Arts, Agricultural Technology, Education, Humanities and Social Science, Industrial Technology, Management Science, and Science and Technology.

Faculty of Arts 
The Faculty of Arts is responsible for supporting local culture and national culture. Dimensions of absorbing arts include Musical Art, Visual Art and Performing Art.

Faculty of Science and Technology 
In 2000, Faculty of Science and Technology contained nine programs: 
 Food Science
 Chemistry and Applied Chemistry
 Computer
 Environment Science
 Health Science
 Physics and General Science
 Mathematics and Statistics
 Biology and Applied Biology
 Rubber Technology and Polymer

References 

Rajabhat University system
Universities in Thailand
Songkhla
Buildings and structures in Songkhla province